Helena Mesa (born 1972) is an American poet.
 
Mesa is the author of the poetry collection Horse Dance Underwater (Cleveland State University Poetry Center, 2009) and co-editor of an anthology of essays, with Blas Falconer and Beth Martinelli, titled Mentor and Muse: Essays from Poets to Poets (Southern Illinois University Press, 2010). In 2010 she was a Residency Recipient from Writers in the Heartland. Mesa's poems have been in journals such as Barrow Street, Bat City Review, Indiana Review, Poet Lore and Third Coast.
 
Helena Mesa was born and raised in Pittsburgh, Pennsylvania to Cuban parents. She is a former writer for Writers in the Schools (WITS) in Houston, TX.  She has a B.A. from Indiana University, an M.F.A from the University of Maryland and a Ph.D. from the University of Houston. Currently, she lives in Ann Arbor, MI and is an associate professor of English at Albion College.

References 

1972 births
Living people
21st-century American poets
Writers from Pittsburgh
American women poets
Indiana University alumni
University of Maryland, College Park alumni
University of Houston alumni
21st-century American women writers
Albion College faculty
American women academics